Madana Gopaludu is a 1987 Telugu-language drama film, produced by V. Ramakrishna and P. Surendra Nath Reddy under the Sri Sailaja Combines banner and directed by P. S. Krishna Mohan Reddy. It stars Rajendra Prasad and Ramya Krishna, with music composed by Sivaji Raja.

Plot
Gopalam (Rajendra Prasad) was born into an Orthodox Brahmin family, his father Rama Chary (J. V. Somayajulu) is a most respectable person in a village who works as a temple priest. Gopalam leaves to town for higher studies where he turns to debauchery, but he acts wisely before his parents. Gopalam is completely submerged in all sorts of vices and does not even have time to attend to his mother's funeral. After some time, his father finds out the reality and takes him back. There, Gopalam is completely reformed as a Sath Brahmin and becomes the temple priest. Rama Chary fixes his alliance with his friend Ranga Chary's (Gollapudi Maruthi Rao) daughter Poornima (Rajyalakshmi). Thereafter, Gopalam's past friends reenter into his life and try to get him back, but he does not yield. But Rama Chary misunderstands his son and commits suicide. After his death, the entire village ostracizes Gopalam, out of depression, Gopalam goes onto his deathbed. Gowri (Ramyakrishna), a scheduled caste girl who liked Gopalam from the beginning protects him. Meanwhile, Syedulu (Balaji), the village goon, publicizes badly on Gopalam & Gowri, so, Gopalam decides to marry her. But shockingly, Poornima claims that Gopalam has spoiled her and village heads order him to marry her. Now Gopalam brings out the truth that Syedulu is the real culprit who has molested Poornima and he threatened her to throw the blame on him. At last, Poornima kills Syedulu and sacrifices her life to protect Gopalam. Finally, the movie ends with Gopalam leaving the village along with Gowri

Cast
Rajendra Prasad as Gopalam
Ramya Krishna as Gowri
Gollapudi Maruthi Rao as Ranga Chary
J. V. Somayajulu as Rama Chary
Suthi Veerabhadra Rao as Manmadha & Ramba (dual role)
Narayana Rao as Dasu
Balaji as Syedulu
Pucha Poornanandam as Bhushaiah
Rajyalakshmi as Poornima
Radha Kumari as Ranga Chary's wife
Mamatha as Subba Lakshmi
Dubbing Janaki as Seeta

Soundtrack

Music composed by Sivaji Raja. Lyrics were written by Acharya Aatreya.

References

Indian drama films
Films scored by Raj–Koti
1980s Telugu-language films